Kızılcahamam is a town and district of Ankara Province in the Central Anatolia region of Turkey, 70 km north of the city of Ankara, near the motorway to Istanbul. According to 2010 census, population of the district is 25,203 of which 16,726 live in the town of Kızılcahamam. The district covers an area of 1,712 km², and the average elevation in district center is 975 m.

The area is mountain and forest, a geographical boundary between central Anatolia and the Black Sea regions.

Kızılcahamam itself is a quiet market town known for its healing hot springs and mineral waters. Nearby Soğuksu National Park contains a scout camp and trails, and areas for picnic in the forest. There are hotels and guest houses including spa hotels. A sculpture of black vulture, an endangered bird species inhabited in the national park, is situated at the entrance of the town.

Climate
The climate in Kızılcahamam is dominated by hot and temperate/mesothermal climate. In winter more precipitation falls than in the summer season. The climate can be classified as Mediterranean climate (Csb) according to Köppen–Geiger climate system.

Administrative divisions

Towns
 Çeltikçi
 Kızılcahamam

Villages

 Adaköy
 Akdoğan
 Aksak
 Alibey
 Alpagut
 Ayvacık
 Aşağıadaköy
 Aşağıçanlı
 Aşağıhüyük
 Aşağıkese
 Bademli
 Balcılar
 Bayırköy
 Bağlıca
 Bağören
 Başağaç
 Başören
 Belpınar
 Berçinçatak
 Berçinyayalar
 Bezcikuzören
 Beşkonak
 Binkoz
 Bulak
 Ciğirler
 Çalta
 Çavuşlar
 Çeçtepe
 Çırpan
 Çukurca
 Çukurören
 Demirciören
 Değirmenönü
 Doymuşören
 Doğanözü
 Esenler
 Eğerlialören
 Eğerlibaşköy
 Eğerlidereköy
 Eğerlikozören
 Gebeler
 Gökbel
 Gölköy
 Gümele
 Güneysaray
 Güvem
 İğdir
 İğmir
 İnceğiz
 İyceler
 Hıdırlar
 Kalemler
 Karaağaç
 Karacaören
 Kasımlar
 Kavaközü
 Kocalar
 Kurumcu
 Kuşcuören
 Kınık (Aşağı)
 Kınık (Yukarı)
 Kırkırca
 Kırköy
 Kışlak
 Kızık
 Kızılca
 Kızılcaören
 Mahkemeağcin
 Olucak
 Ortaköy
 Otacı
 Oğlakçı
 Örencik
 Pazar Başören
 Pazar
 Salın
 Saraycık
 Sarayköy
 Saraçköy
 Sazak
 Semeler
 Semer
 Süleler
 Şahinler
 Tahtalar
 Taşlıca
 Turnalı
 Ugurlu
 Üçbaş
 Üyücek
 Yakakaya
 Yanık
 Yağcıhüseyin
 Yeni Dereneci
 Yeşilköy
 Yukarıhüyük
 Yukarıkaraören
 Yukarıkese
 Yukarıçanlı
 Yıldırımdemirciler
 Yıldırımhacılar
 Yıldırımyağlıca
 Yıldırımçatak
 Yıldırımören

Notes

References

External links

 District governor's official website 
 Map of Kızılcahamam
 District municipality's official website 

 
Districts of Ankara Province
Populated places in Ankara Province
Spa towns in Turkey